Gertrudes Ida Morg (10 April 1925 – 8 March 2016) was a Brazilian sprinter. She competed in the women's 4 × 100 metres relay at the 1948 Summer Olympics.

References

External links
 

1925 births
2016 deaths
Athletes (track and field) at the 1948 Summer Olympics
Brazilian female sprinters
Brazilian female long jumpers
Olympic athletes of Brazil
People from Nova Friburgo
Sportspeople from Rio de Janeiro (state)